Wojciech Gutorski (born 25 May 1982 in Bydgoszcz) is a Polish rower. He participated in three Olympic Games so far, including the 2012 Summer Olympics in London where he competed in the Men's Pair event together with his teammate Jarosław Godek. They finished fourth in the B finals, earning them a tenth place overall.  In the 2004 and 2008 Games he was part of the Polish men's eight, finishing in 8th and 5th places respectively.

References

1982 births
Living people
Rowers at the 2004 Summer Olympics
Rowers at the 2008 Summer Olympics
Rowers at the 2012 Summer Olympics
Polish male rowers
Olympic rowers of Poland
Sportspeople from Bydgoszcz
European Rowing Championships medalists